Pseudotriacanthus strigilifer, the long-spined tripodfish, is a species of Triacanthidae native to the Indian Ocean and the central western Pacific Ocean where it is found in coastal marine waters, also entering brackish waters in estuaries, at depths of from .  This species grows to a length of  TL though it more usually does not exceed  TL.  It is of minor commercial importance and is also found in the aquarium trade.  This species is the only known member of its genus.

References

Tetraodontiformes
Taxa named by Alec Fraser-Brunner
Monotypic marine fish genera